Pseudarista is a genus of moths of the family Noctuidae. The genus was erected by Schaus in 1916.

Species
Pseudarista geldersi Schaus, 1916 Suriname
Pseudarista pagasusalis (Walker, 1859) Brazil
Pseudarista spiosalis (Walker, [1859]) Venezuela

References

Herminiinae